Zabrus poggii is a species of ground beetle in the Pterostichinae subfamily that is endemic to Syria.

References

Beetles described in 2002
Beetles of Asia
Endemic fauna of Syria
Zabrus